Lindsay Davenport was the defending champion and successfully defended her title, defeating Magdalena Maleeva 6–4, 6–1 in the final. It was the 1st title of the year and the 39th of her career.

Seeds
The first four seeds received a bye into the second round.

Draw

Finals

Top half

Bottom half

External links
 Main and Qualifying Draws

Toray Pan Pacific Open Singles
2004 Women's Singles
2004 Toray Pan Pacific Open